Baby thief is a Ghanaian movie that was acted in 1991. The movie features Emmanuel Yeboah Asomah and  John Dumelo as a toddler known as saka who.

Cast
 John Dumelo
 Emmanuel Yeboah Asomah (KLB), now a Counselor, a Nurse and HIV advocate in Ghana

References

Ghanaian drama films
1991 films